Mattheus Wilhelmus Maria (Thijs) de Graauw (born 10 March 1942 in Kerkdriel) is a Dutch astronomer.

Thijs de Graauw studied astronomy at Utrecht University and received there his Ph.D. in 1975 under H. van Buren with a dissertation on heterodyne instrumentation applied to infrared observations. From 1975 to 1983 he worked as a scientist for the Space Science Department of ESA (European Space Agency). At ESA's largest facility, ESTEC in Noordwijk, he worked on the development of microwave receivers. In 1983 he became the director of the Groningen branch of SRON (Stichting Ruimte Onderzoek Nederland). From 2008 to 2013 he was the director of the Atacama Large Millimeter/submillimeter Array (ALMA).

In 2012 he won the Joseph Weber Award for his work on the short wavelength spectrometer on the Infrared Space Observatory and also for his work on the HIFI camera, which was launched on board Herschel, ESA's infrared space observatory.

He was elected a Legacy Fellow of the American Astronomical Society in 2020

References

External links
Thijs de Graauw: ALMA contribution to Astrochemistry – YouTube, uploaded 1 June 2011

1942 births
Living people
People from Maasdriel
20th-century Dutch astronomers
Utrecht University alumni
Academic staff of Leiden University
Fellows of the American Astronomical Society
21st-century Dutch astronomers